Blair David MacKasey (born December 13, 1955) is a Canadian former professional ice hockey defenceman. He played one game in the National Hockey League, with the Toronto Maple Leafs during the 1976–77 season, on October 5, 1976 against the Colorado Rockies. He was drafted in the fourth round, 55th overall, by the Washington Capitals in the 1975 NHL Entry Draft. He was also drafted by the Indianapolis Racers (fourth round, 47th overall) of the World Hockey Association in the 1975 WHA Amateur Draft. MacKasey was born in Hamilton, Ontario.

Playing career
As a youth, he played in the 1967 Quebec International Pee-Wee Hockey Tournament with a minor ice hockey team from Verdun, Quebec.

MacKasey played one game in the National Hockey League, with the Toronto Maple Leafs during the 1976–77 season. He also played minor-league baseball for two seasons in the Montreal Expos organization.

Post-playing career
After his playing career ended, MacKasey was head scout for the Phoenix Coyotes from 1996, and then head scout for Hockey Canada from June 2002 until July 2005, when he became Director of Player Personnel. From January 2006 to 2013 MacKasey held the position of Director of Professional Scouting for the Minnesota Wild, and then served as their Director of Player Personal from 2013 to 2018.

Career statistics

Regular season and playoffs

See also
 List of players who played only one game in the NHL

References

External links
 

1955 births
Living people
Arizona Coyotes scouts
Canadian ice hockey coaches
Canadian ice hockey defencemen
Dallas Black Hawks players
Dayton Gems players
Drummondville Voltigeurs coaches
Granby Bisons coaches
Ice hockey people from Ontario
Indianapolis Racers draft picks
Jamestown Expos players
Minnesota Wild executives
Minnesota Wild scouts
Montreal Junior Canadiens players
Montreal Bleu Blanc Rouge players
Richmond Robins players
Sportspeople from Hamilton, Ontario
Toronto Maple Leafs players
Washington Capitals draft picks